Amanita subfuliginea is a mushroom of the large genus Amanita, which occurs central and southern China (Hunan and Guangdong Provinces). It is closely related to the east Asian death cap A. fuliginea.

See also

List of Amanita species
List of deadly fungi

References

subfuliginea
Poisonous fungi
Deadly fungi
Fungi of Asia
Fungi of China
Fungi described in 2016